Lamonica is a given name and surname. Notable people with the name include:

LaMonica Garrett (born 1975), American actor and Slamball player
Daryle Lamonica (1941–2022), American football player